The General Planning Commission (Commissariat général du Plan) was an advisory body reporting to the government of France.  It was established by the Chairman of the French Provisional Government, Charles de Gaulle, on 3 January 1946.  

The General Planning Commission's first plan, the Modernization and Re-equipment Plan, was designed to spur economic reconstruction following World War II.  Its aims were: (1) to develop national production and foreign trade, particularly in those fields where France is most favourably placed; (2) to increase productivity; (3) to ensure the full employment of manpower; (4) to raise the standard of living and to improve the environment and the conditions of national life.  This plan is commonly known as the Monnet Plan after Jean Monnet, the chief advocate and first head of the General Planning Commission.  

In pursuit of its objectives, the General Planning Commission set production targets for 1950 according to the resources that were then expected to be available, starting with six crucial sectors: coal mining, steel, electricity, rail transport, cement, and farm machinery.  Later oil, chemicals, fertilizers, synthetic fertilizers, synthetic fibres, shipbuilding and other sectors were added.  The Commission's plan emphasized expansion, modernization, efficiency, and modern management practice.  It set investment targets, and allocated investment funds.     

The plan’s process – focusing, prioritizing, and pointing the way – has been called "indicative planning" to differentiate it from highly directive and rigid Soviet style planning.  

The General Planning Commission continued to produce a multi-year plan for France until 2006 when it was succeeded by the Centre d’analyse stratégique.  In 2013, France Stratégie took over from the Centre d'analyse stratégique.

See also
Monnet Plan
Economic history of France

References

Government agencies of France
Economic history of France
Economic planning
Government agencies established in 1946
1946 establishments in France
Government agencies established in 2006
2006 disestablishments in France